Africans in Malaysia or African Malaysians, are people of full or partial African descent who were born in or immigrated to Malaysia. Large-scale, uncontrolled immigration from Africa to Malaysia is only a recent phenomenon, with Europe and the rest of Asia traditionally being the largest sources of migration to Malaysia.

Africans in Malaysia are of diverse ethnic, cultural, linguistic, religious, and socioeconomic backgrounds. A majority of Africans in Malaysia originate from Nigeria. Most originally came posing as students, businessmen and tourists, but the vast majority overstayed their visa and ended up as illegal residents in Malaysia. Immigration of Africans to Malaysia and other Asian countries has become increasingly common due to tighter restrictions on immigration in Europe.

In 2012, around 79,352 Africans entered Malaysia legally. They were issued with a total of 25,467 student visas.

There are quite a number of mixed Malaysian-African population. Among the most notable, Aya Amiruddin a Tiktok Influencer.

Further reading 
 Malaysians' opinions about the African community AsiaOne

References 

African
African diaspora in Malaysia
Immigration to Malaysia